Ronzone (Renzón in local dialect) is a comune (municipality) in Trentino in the northern Italian region Trentino-Alto Adige/Südtirol, located about  north of Trento.

Ronzone borders the following municipalities: Fondo, Malosco, Sarnonico and Eppan.

Demographic evolution

References

Cities and towns in Trentino-Alto Adige/Südtirol
Nonsberg Group